Trevor Sherban (born December 11, 1972) is a Canadian former professional ice hockey and inline hockey defenceman.

Sherban played major junior hockey in the Western Hockey League (WHL). He went on to play eleven seasons of professional hockey, including two seasons in the West Coast Hockey League (WCHL) with the San Diego Gulls where he was recognized for his outstanding play when he was named to the 2001–02 WCHL First All-Star Team.

Awards and honours

2002-03 WCHL Playoffs Most Goals by Defenseman (3)
2002-03 WCHL Taylor Cup Champion 
2005-06 Italy Champion

Roller Hockey International
Sherban played four seasons of major professional inline hockey within Roller Hockey International, the first major professional league for inline hockey which operated in North America from 1993 to 1999. He played the 1993 RHI inaugural season with the Portland Rage, 1994 with the Tampa-Bay Tritons, 1996 with the Oklahoma Coyotes, and 1997 with the San Jose Rhinos.

References

External links

1972 births
Living people
Amstel Tijgers players
Amsterdam Bulldogs players
Canadian ice hockey defencemen
EC Bad Tölz players
HC Milano players
Ice hockey people from Edmonton
Kansas City Blades players
Missouri River Otters players
Newcastle North Stars players
Portland Winterhawks players
San Diego Gulls (WCHL) players
Saskatoon Blades players
Tri-City Americans players
University of Alberta alumni
Wichita Thunder players